Pravara Rural Engineering College (PREC), a private college in India, is affiliated to the University of Pune, India and is recognized by All India Council for Technical Education, New Delhi. The institute provides simulating academic environment for new technology. Academic study combined with industrial graduate research projects prepare the student for professional practice in engineering.

Description
Pravara Rural Engineering College, Loni was established in 1983 and is one of the highest ranked colleges amongst those affiliated to the University of Pune. The institute is located in Loni, District Ahmednagar in the state of Maharashtra, a center for education in India. Since its foundation the institute has progressed steadily, and currently offers undergraduate majors in Instrumentation & Control, Electronics, Electronics & Computer , Electronics and Telecommunications, Chemical, Civil, Computers, Mechanical , Automation & Robotics and Information Technology fields. The institute also offers Masters in Instrumentation & Control, Mechanical, and Civil Engineering.

Admissions
Admissions to the undergraduate course are granted collectively on the basis of Common Entrance Test for Engineering (CET) and marks obtained in subjects Physics, Chemistry and Mathematics of the Higher Secondary Certificate Examination or Equivalent.

References

External links
 Pravara Rural Engineering College Loni - Official Website
 PREC - South Campus on Wikimapia
 PREC - North Campus on Wikimapia
 video of silver jubilee celebration

Engineering colleges in Maharashtra
Colleges affiliated to Savitribai Phule Pune University
All India Council for Technical Education
Education in Ahmednagar district
Educational institutions established in 1983
1983 establishments in Maharashtra